Polka! All Night Long is an album by Jimmy Sturr. It was released through Rounder Records in 1996. In 1997, the album won Sturr the Grammy Award for Best Polka Album.

Track listing
 "All Night Long" (Gimble, Wills) – 2:48
 "Swirl" (Soyka, Sturr) – 3:15
 "Tavern in the Town" (traditional) – 2:05
 "Edelweiss" (Hammerstein, Rodgers) – 2:27
 "Alice" (Chapman, Chinn) – 3:58
 "Krakow Bridge") – 2:23
 "Cajun Fiddle" (Rich) – 2:10
 "Big Ball's in Cowtown" (Nix) – 2:46
 "Dizzy Fingers" (Sturr) – 3:47
 "Green Valley" (Wills) – 2:52
 "My Sophie" (Wojnarowski) – 1:59
 "Can't Afford to Be a Star" (Gerstenfeld, Lenard) – 2:48
 "Alice [Rock Version]" (Chapman, Chinn) – 3:28

See also
 Polka in the United States

References

1996 albums
Grammy Award for Best Polka Album
Jimmy Sturr albums
Rounder Records albums